Western Suburbs, an electoral district of the Legislative Assembly in the Australian state of New South Wales was created in 1920 and abolished in 1927.


Election results

Elections in the 1920s

1925

1922

1920

References

New South Wales state electoral results by district